Bishop Niranjan Sual Singh is the serving bishop of the Roman Catholic Diocese of Sambalpur, India .

Early life and education 
He was born in Kottama, India on 20 July 1961 to Mr. Ambrose Sual Singh & Mrs. Bastina Sual Singh. He holds a doctorate in theology from the Pontifical Urban University, Rome.

Priesthood 
He was ordained a priest on 29 April 1991.

Episcopate 
He succeeded Bishop Lukas Kerketta, S.V.D., and was appointed by the pope on 26 July 2013 and ordained on 28 September 2013.

See also 
List of Catholic bishops of India

References

External links 

Living people
21st-century Roman Catholic bishops in India
People from Odisha
1961 births
Pontifical Urban University alumni